Casbah City is an Algerian comedy television series, directed by Issam Bouguerra. It debuted on 27 May 2017 on El Djazairia One.

Overview 
The series revolves around the diary of neighbours living in the popular casbah neighbourhood, and what happens inside. Some of the quarrels between neighbours and those who challenge each other in times of crisis appear.

Cast

References

External links 

2010s Algerian television series
2017 Algerian television series debuts
Arabic television series
El Djazairia One original programming